Enoch Tranter (27 April 1842 – 23 September 1910) was an English cricketer active in the mid-1870s.  Born at Old Park, Shropshire, Tranter was a left-handed batsman and left-arm roundarm fast bowler who made three appearances in first-class cricket.

During the 1870s Tranter played his club cricket for Sefton Park in Liverpool, and was selected to play for Lancashire in 1875, making his debut in first-class cricket against Derbyshire at Old Trafford. He made two further first-class appearances for Lancashire, one in 1875 against the Marylebone Cricket Club at Lord's, and against Kent at Rochdale in 1876. Tranter took 3 wickets with his roundarm bowling, with best figures of 2/11. When fielding he would often field at slip.

His occupation outside of cricket was as a coal miner. He died at Donnington Wood, Shropshire on 23 September 1910.

References

External links
Enoch Tranter at ESPNcricinfo
Enoch Tranter at CricketArchive

1842 births
1910 deaths
People from Telford
English cricketers
Lancashire cricketers
British coal miners